Communications Hill is a neighborhood located in the San Juan Bautista Hills of San Jose, California.

History

Before the Spanish entrada, the Tamyen people mined the area for chert, which was typically used for debitage and arrow points.

On November 29, 1777, Juan Bautista de Anza selected the area to become the southernmost region in the first land tract of the San Jose pueblo (the first pueblo-town in California not associated with a mission or a military post). Although similarly named, the San Juan Bautista Hills were not part of the neighboring Rancho San Juan Bautista Mexican land grant.

Located in the northern area of Communications Hill, Oak Hill Memorial Park, the oldest secular cemetery operating in California, performed its first recorded burial in 1847.

Tyler Beach purchased the Dairy Hill area in the late 1860s and named it Beach Hill Farm, which was used to supply the former St. James Hotel.

On March 2, 1886, Southern Pacific incorporated the San Jose & Almaden Railroad (consolidated with the Southern Pacific on May 14, 1888) to build the Lick Branch from Hillsdale (now Capitol Station) 7.7 miles to Almaden. The branch was opened on November 16, 1866, and ran for several years. However, the line was shortened due to an abandonment in 1937 (probably due to the New Almaden mine shutting down after the Great Depression). The remainder of the Lick Branch was formally abandoned in January 1981.

Between 1887 and 1890, the San Jose Vineyard operated in the area.

In the late 1800s, José S. Azevedo (of the Azevedo-Machado-Vieira family, a prominent Portuguese-American family of San Jose) emigrated from São Jorge Island in the Azores. He purchased 96 acres of land in the area in 1896 and created a dairy farm known as the American Dairy Company.

In 1916 (after José S. Azevedo's passing in 1915), Manuel Azevedo and Manuel Lewis took over the dairy farm. Manuel Azevedo's nephew, Manuel Bettencourt managed the creamery after Manuel Azevedo died. After Manuel Bettencourt died, control of the dairy went to Bettencourt's nephew, Anthony Bettencourt. In the 1970s, control of the ranch passed to Anthony Bettencourt's son, Robert J. Bettencourt who continues own land in the area through a family trust known as Mta Land Corporation.

The Azevedo Quarry was actively mined by Raisch Products from 1971 to 2006 (reclamation activity continued until 2009). An aggregate recycling facility remains on the land, but it is also expected to shutdown in 2023 and be redeveloped into an office park when the county use permit expires.

Starting in 1984, the Government of San Jose began preparing Communications Hill, then largely barren, for development into a mixed-use, high density, urban neighborhood. This was formalized with the creation of the Communications Hill Specific Plan in 1992. Mta Land Corporation, a family trust managed by the Bettencourt family, began the process of residential development in 2002.

Annexation of parcels to the city of San Jose has occurred as recently as December 9, 2014.

The area is currently undergoing significant construction, which has been divided into four phases.

A "village center" is planned, which will include shops and restaurants positioned to have a view of the downtown San Jose skyline.

Long Lines Tower
The brutalist tower located prominently on the hill was part of the AT&T Long Lines telecommunications network. Known as the "Oak Hills" tower and constructed in 1972, it was designed to hold KS-15676 horn antennas to relay data between the San Jose long lines tower (located at Almaden Blvd and West San Fernando St.) and the long lines tower on Hogsback Ridge (near East Dunne Ave). The tower has several levels of underground facilities (such as offices, bathrooms, a lunch room, and storage areas).

Geography

The Communications Hill neighborhood is located east of California State Route 87, west of Monterey Road, north of Capitol Expressway and south of Curtner Avenue.

Parks and trails

The neighborhood has multiple scenic overlooks of the Santa Cruz Mountains, Diablo Range, and the surrounding Santa Clara Valley.

Communications Hill is home to the following parks and trails:
Vieira Park
Communications Hill Trail
Elaine Richardson Park
Communications Hill Grand Staircase
Hillcrest Open Space
Hillsdale Fitness Park
Kurte Park
Margaret Kell Park
Rancho San Juan Bautista Park
Waterford Park
William Lewis Manly Park

Transportation
Nearby public transportation options include:
 Capitol station (VTA) for light rail.
 Capitol station (Caltrain) for commuter rail.
 Curtner station for light rail.

A pedestrian bridge and trail are planned to allow easier access to the Capitol Caltrain station.

Public services
Communications Hill is home to Engine House 33 of the San José Fire Department.

The hill is also home to the Santa Clara County Communications Dispatch center (which handles 9-1-1 calls for the county).

References

Neighborhoods in San Jose, California